Glenn Anthony Richards (born 29 December 1973) is an Australian musician, best known as the mainstay guitarist singer-songwriter for the Australian rock band Augie March.

Early life
Richards was born in Shepparton, Victoria on 29 December 1973. Richards saved up enough money to buy his first guitar by working long hours on the docks in Fremantle, Western Australia.

With Augie March
Richards joined Augie March in August 1995, playing his first gig with them five years later.

To date they have released two EPs and six LPs, while Richards has released one solo album in 2010 and one EP as G.A. Richards and the Dark Satanic Mills Bros.

Glenn now lives with his family in Tasmania in West Hobart, a suburb of Hobart with views of the city, the Derwent Estuary and the surrounding suburbs.

Awards and nominations

APRA Awards
The APRA Awards are presented annually by the Australasian Performing Right Association (APRA).

|-
|rowspan="2"| 2007 || "One Crowded Hour" – Glenn Richards || Song of the Year || 
|-
| Glenn Richards || Breakthrough Songwriter Award ||

Discography

Albums

Extended plays
Closed Off, Cold & Bitter – Life as a Can of Beer (2006)

References

External links 
Official Augie March Website
Official Augie March Forum

1972 births
Living people
APRA Award winners
Australian rock singers
Australian indie pop musicians
Australian indie rock musicians
21st-century Australian singers